Storeria occipitomaculata, commonly known as the redbelly snake or the red-bellied snake, is a species of snake endemic to North America (Canada and the United States).

Description 
S. occipitomaculata is a small woodland species that ranges from 4–10 in (10-25 cm) long. Their colors range from an orange to gray, black, or brown. They can be distinguished from other species from their bright red or orange underbelly.

Habitat 
S. occipitomaculata prefers warmer habitats and in the more Northern limits of its range will inhabit abandoned ant mounds. These mounds absorb solar radiation and are insulated which allows for a longer active season. This species, with large eyes and a kinetic skull, are not able to burrow on their own effectively and abandoned ant mounds allow them access to a warm area to retreat to. Individuals of this species can be found under logs and leafy debris due to their secretive nature.

Reproduction 
Redbelly snakes have been studied to reproduce annually and females have been found to be gravid during the spring and early summer. While body size varies throughout the redbelly snake's region, the average clutch size tends to remain the same with an average of 7-9 eggs per clutch. Redbelly snakes begin mating at around two years of age and must be a minimum of 22 cm in order to reach sexual maturity.

Subspecies
Three subspecies, including the nominotypical subspecies, are recognized as being valid:
Florida redbelly snake – Storeria occipitomaculata obscura (Trapido, 1944)
Northern redbelly snake – Storeria occipitomaculata occipitomaculata (Storer, 1839)  
Black Hills redbelly snake – Storeria occipitomaculata pahasapae (H.M. Smith, 1963)

References

External links
Redbelly Snake, Reptiles and Amphibians of Iowa
Red-bellied Snake, Illinois Natural History Survey

Storeria
Snakes of North America
Reptiles of Canada
Reptiles of the United States
Extant Pleistocene first appearances
Taxa named by David Humphreys Storer
Reptiles described in 1839